Philip Owens was an English poet and novelist of the 1920s and 1930s.  He appears in the 1930 anthology European Caravan, edited by Samuel Putnam, which also introduced much of the world to Jacob Bronowski, William Empson, and Samuel Beckett.  He was a frequent contributor to Jack Lindsay's literary journal, The London Aphrodite.  He is also the author of a novel, Hobohemians, and the editor of Bed and Sometimes Breaksfast: An Anthology of Landladies.

References

Year of birth missing
Year of death missing
English male poets